Alejandrina Mireya Luis Hernández, often referred to as Mireya (born August 25, 1967 in Camagüey) is a retired Cuban volleyball player.

Life 
At the age of 10 she started playing volleyball. At 16, Mireya joined the Cuban national team for the 1983 Pan-American Games, in which Cuba took first place. She would play with them again in the 1987 Games, and Cuba would again win the tournament. After a brief hiatus due to injury, she resumed play in 1990 at the World Championship in Japan where the Cuban team finished fourth. In 1991 she led the Cuban team to win its first ever World Cup in Mexico  . Mireya won her first Olympic gold medal at the 1992 Games in Barcelona with team mate Regla Bell. She would win a second gold in Atlanta in 1996, again playing with the Cuban national team.  Meanwhile, she also led Cuba to two world championships in 1994 where she was chosen the best spiker and Cuba won every match with a perfect 3-0. The team would win again in 1998. Mireya retired after a second Grand Prix and a third Olympic gold medal in 2000.

Luis is known for her spectacular jumping power reaching 3.39 meter, more than any other player, though being only 1.75 meter tall.
She earned numerous "best scorer", "best spiker" and "best player" awards at world, Olympic and continental championships.

Individual awards
 1989 FIVB Volleyball Women's World Cup "Most Valuable Player"
 1989 FIVB Volleyball Women's World Cup "Best Spiker"
 1991 FIVB Volleyball Women's World Cup "Best Attacker"
 1991 FIVB Volleyball Women's World Cup "Spirit of Fight"
 1994 FIVB Volleyball Women's World Championship "Best Spiker"
 1993 FIVB Volleyball World Grand Prix "Most Valuable Player"
 1995 FIVB Volleyball Women's World Cup "Most Valuable Player"
 1995 FIVB Volleyball Women's World Cup "Best Spiker"''

External links

1967 births
Living people
Cuban women's volleyball players
Volleyball players at the 1992 Summer Olympics
Volleyball players at the 1996 Summer Olympics
Volleyball players at the 2000 Summer Olympics
Olympic volleyball players of Cuba
Olympic gold medalists for Cuba
Sportspeople from Camagüey
Olympic medalists in volleyball
Medalists at the 2000 Summer Olympics
Medalists at the 1996 Summer Olympics
Medalists at the 1992 Summer Olympics
Wing spikers
Central American and Caribbean Games medalists in volleyball
Central American and Caribbean Games gold medalists for Cuba
Competitors at the 1998 Central American and Caribbean Games
Pan American Games medalists in volleyball
Pan American Games gold medalists for Cuba
Pan American Games silver medalists for Cuba
Medalists at the 1983 Pan American Games
Medalists at the 1987 Pan American Games
Medalists at the 1991 Pan American Games
Medalists at the 1995 Pan American Games
Medalists at the 1999 Pan American Games